FC MVO Moscow (Moskovskiy Voyennyi Okrug (MVO)) was a Soviet football club from Moscow, Soviet Union. The club existed after World War II between 1945–53. In 1951–52 it represented the city of Kalinin (today – Tver).

MVO is a Russian abbreviation that stands for the Moscow Military District. Until 1951 it competed in the Class B (Soviet First League) when it received promotion to the Class A (Soviet Top League) for the 1952 season. Next year in 1953, after the death of Joseph Stalin, the club withdrew from competitions after playing only six games.

Football clubs in the Russian Soviet Federative Socialist Republic
Defunct football clubs in Moscow
Association football clubs established in 1945
Association football clubs disestablished in 1953
Armed Forces sports society
Military association football clubs in Russia
Soviet Top League clubs